Museum of the Armed Act is a museum in Kraków, Poland. It was established in 1963 and by 1970 had 3000 artifacts.

References

External links 
 

Museums in Kraków
Museums established in 1963
World War II museums in Poland